NASCAR Inside Nextel Cup was a show that aired Monday nights on Speed Channel during the NASCAR season. Inside Nextel Cup was hosted by Dave Despain. The show was taped every Monday morning at Speed's studios in Charlotte, North Carolina about 11 am, unless a race is postponed to Monday, in which case the show takes place live. The show usually ran for 60 minutes, except for a brief period during the first few weeks of the 2005 season, when it ran for 90 minutes.  Speed Channel chose to discontinue this show at the end of the 2007 NASCAR season, replacing it in 2008 with the similar program This Week in NASCAR.

History
Inside Nextel Cup originally broadcast on SpeedVision, and was called Inside Winston Cup until the title-sponsor change in 2004. The show was also rebroadcast on several Fox Sports Net affiliates when the show was on SpeedVision, but was exclusively on Speed from 2002 to 2007.

The first episode aired after the 1996 Daytona 500. The original host was Allen Bestwick, who then broadcast races on Motor Racing Network. The original panelists were chosen because they each drove a different make of race car; Michael Waltrip drove a Ford, Ken Schrader drove a Chevrolet, and Johnny Benson drove a Pontiac.

The show has been so popular that when Fox, NBC, and TNT signed a television deal to broadcast NASCAR races starting in 2001, thousands of emails and faxes came in to ask that the show be saved. The show went on hiatus after NASCAR embargoed all race footage from non-NASCAR broadcast partners, meaning that there would be no highlight show on Speed.

But the death of Dale Earnhardt in the 2001 Daytona 500, plus various changes in NASCAR, prompted Speed producers to tape a special reunion program. The program, called "One More Time", involved only the regular panelists and frequent substitute Kenny Wallace, shooting on location at Schrader's home on Lake Norman in North Carolina.

But when Speed became an official broadcast partner of NASCAR, the show began broadcasting again in 2002. It also had a spin-off, as Inside NBS debuted in 2003. The show was mostly devoted to the Busch Series, NASCAR's version of Triple-A baseball. Bestwick was joined by panelists Hank Parker Jr. and Randy LaJoie. It only lasted one season.

Original show format
The show would show the previous day's races, with Bestwick reading notes while the highlights were shown. The panel would then analyze the action taking place in the on-screen video, whether it's a pass for position or a crash. Sometimes, a member of the panel has to analyze a mishap he himself had, which leads Bestwick and the other two panelists to tease him about it. Other times, though, the panelist will be shown in a moment of success on the track. Also, there are times when two of the panelists will watch themselves in a battle for position, or being caught up in the same crash.

After the race highlights, a now-discontinued interview segment called "The Hot Seat" would take place, in which Bestwick and the panel asked the guest questions (and sometimes ribbed him in a friendly way). Guests ranged from drivers to NASCAR officials to even singer-songwriter Edwin McCain, who performed on the segment in July 2004. Often, the Hot Seat guest would stick around as the latest news and action in the NASCAR Busch Series and Craftsman Truck Series is recapped.

Other assorted segments filled out the rest of the hour. Sometimes, a Speed camera crew would follow Michael Waltrip to various events, including a hilarious segment at an Iowa pumpkin farm. Another segment, SpeedFan Q&A, led to some answers and a few non-answers. The next Cup race would be previewed in detail, and, in the last few seconds of the show, the panelists would plug an appearance they are making later in the week.

Final show format
On September 5, 2005, a major (and controversial) change took place — Bestwick, removed from his hosting duties, hosted his last show, and was replaced by Dave Despain, who hosts Speed's WindTunnel with Dave Despain. Benson, a panelist on the show from the beginning, was replaced by Brian Vickers. Benson was not present for Bestwick's last show. After the 2006 season, Vickers was dropped from the show, and Greg Biffle was announced as his replacement.

With Despain as host, the formula of the show changed. The show focuses almost exclusively on Nextel Cup, especially during the 10 weeks of the Chase for the Nextel Cup. The "Hot Seat" segment was dropped in favor of a remote interview with either the winning driver or winning crew chief from the previous week's race. The show became much more tightly controlled (with the panelists holding clipboards and notepads now) and less spontaneous. The segment previewing the next Cup race has been dropped, and no show was taped in 2006 during off-weeks.

Inside Nextel Cup has been parodied in a commercial for Aaron's, where Despain, Waltrip, and Schrader comment on a pair of shoppers going through an Aaron's store.

This Week in NASCAR
Inside Nextel Cup was replaced in 2008.  Veteran NASCAR personality Steve Byrnes took over hosting duties on the newly named This Week in NASCAR, which premiered February 18.
This Week in NASCAR replaced the NASCAR Sprint Cup race re-cap and analysis show, moving into a "handoff" position between events, reviewing topical items from previous races in all three NASCAR national touring series, while also looking forward to upcoming events. Familiar faces, including Michael Waltrip, Greg Biffle and Ken Schrader remained as regular Monday night panelists, with NASCAR crew chiefs, including three-time champ Chad Knaus also joining the show.

Incidents
 In 2000, Darrell Waltrip came on the show as a special guest and Allen Bestwick could barely get a word in edgewise to get to commercial.
 In 2003, after Michael Waltrip won the Daytona 500, he couldn't make the show because of the numerous television appearances mandated of the champion. He appeared via satellite from Daytona USA, and started his segment with Allen Bestwick, mouthing silently, "I'm just so pleased, so happy to have won the race." Then, he vocalized the words, "I was just fakin'." The entire studio burst into laughter at the practical joke.
 In 2004, the earpiece that the control room uses to talk to each driver fell in Michael Waltrip's ear canal. A crew member with a long pair of tweezers was dispatched to fish it out.
 In 2005, a power-washing crew started its work during the show's taping. The show kept rolling, and Allen Bestwick, continuing on a theme of rude driving and behavior of some drivers, quipped, "Now, that's rude."

Inside Nextel Cup
Speed (TV network) original programming
1996 American television series debuts
2007 American television series endings
NASCAR Cup Series